Parthan Mohan (born 27 July) is a Malayalam Film Director and Producer. He made his directorial debut in 2013, with the Malayalam Film ONE with Jagadeesh in the lead role and went onto to serve as Executive producer in the film John Paul Vaathil Thurakkunnu (2014) and later co-produced Olappeeppi (2016) & Crossroad (2017).

Early life 

Born on July 27th, 1986 at Trivandrum, Kerala in India into a family of teachers, Parthan finished his schooling from the nationally reputed Kendriya Vidyalaya, Pattom in Trivandrum in 2004. He went onto pursue his graduate studies at Mar Ivanios College, Trivandrum from where he finished his graduation in Visual and Mass Communication. He earned his Bachelors’ Degree in Video Production & Mass Communication (BVMC) from the University of Kerala with top honours in 2007.

He also wrote and directed his first short film, ‘Memoirs’, during his campus days at Mar Ivanios, which went onto to participate in a number of Campus Short Film Festivals around South India.

Parthan went onto pursue film studies more earnestly, as he got inducted into the L V Prasad Film & TV Academy in Chennai, from where he finished a two-year full time Post Graduate Diploma course in Film Direction. In the course of his studies, he completed around ten projects, including four short fiction projects and a couple of documentary projects and a music video.

He went onto pursue his graduate studies at Mar Ivanios College, Trivandrum from where he earned his bachelor's degree in Video Production & Mass Communication (BVMC) from the University of Kerala with top honours in 2007.
Parthan went onto graduate from the L V Prasad Film & TV Academy in Chennai, where he secured his Post Graduate Diploma in Film Direction.
His Diploma Film at the Academy, ‘Apratheekshitham’, won critical acclaim and was selected to International Film Festivals, such as the Mumbai International Film Festival 2010, ‘I’ve Seen Films’ International Film Festival at Milan, Italy and the ASIEXPO International Film Festival at Lyon, France.

Career 
Parthan made his debut in feature films, by directing the 2013 Experimental Horror Thriller ‘ONE’, starring Jagadeesh in Malayalam. The movie went onto earn good reviews from the critics and marked a rare new experience for film goers with its intricate use of the Classical Horror Elements and was noticed for its use of ‘Mise-en-Scene’.

He ventured into the Feature Film Production when he served as the executive producer in the Malayalam Feature Film, John Paul Vaathil Thurakkunnu  released in July 2014.

During this period, Parthan has also been invited as guest faculty at media and business institutes of repute such as the Asian School of Business, College of Engineering, Trivandrum, All Saints College, Trivandrum & College of Architecture, Trivandrum and so on.

In 2016, Parthan served as Co-Producer in Olappeeppi , starring Biju Menon. The movie hit theatres across Kerala in late September 2016 and was welcome wholeheartedly by critics and viewers alike and went onto win two awards at the Kerala State Film Awards 2017.

In 2017, he finished produced ‘Mudra’, a 15-minute featurette for the Malayalam Anthology Film Crossroad, dealing with women. Mudra featured Isha Talwar & Anjali Nair in leading roles and portrayed the story of two classical dancers and their struggles.

He is right now writing and directing an upcoming feature film in Malayalam, scheduled for production in the mid-2019, which will be in the genre of a coming-of-age drama.

Filmography

References

External links 

Malayalam film directors
Malayalam film producers
People from Kerala